Svend Rindom (30 June 1884 – 11 December 1960) was a Danish screenwriter and film actor. He wrote for 36 films between 1911 and 1950 and appeared in approximately twelve films from 1912 to 1943.

He was born in Copenhagen and died in Copenhagen. His wife was actress Ellen Diedrich and his daughter was actress Jessie Rindom. He is buried in the Assistens Cemetery in Copenhagen.

Selected filmography
 Master of the House (1925)
 5 raske piger (1933)
 Life on the Hegn Farm (1938)
 Circus (1939)
 Familien Olsen (1940)
 Tyrannens fald (1942)
 Affæren Birte (1945)
 De kloge og vi gale (1945)
 Det gælder os alle (1949)
 Love Wins Out (1949)
 Mosekongen (1950)

References

External links

1884 births
1960 deaths
Danish male film actors
Danish male silent film actors
20th-century Danish male actors
Danish male screenwriters
Male actors from Copenhagen
20th-century screenwriters